Rah Ahan Square (Persian:میدان راه‌آهن literally meaning Railway Square) is a square located in southern Tehran, Iran. Tehran Railway Station is located at this square.

Transportation
  Valiasr Street
  Kargar Street
  Shush Street
 Tehran railway station
  Rahahan Metro Station

Former
The Tehran trolleybus system's route 5 served Rah Ahan Square starting in 2010, but the service was withdrawn at an unknown date between 2011 and 2013.

References

Streets in Tehran
Squares in Tehran